Selwyn Walford Young (1899–1977), usually known as Walford Young, was a Belizean musician and composer. Among his most famous compositions is Belize's national anthem, "Land of the Free", accompanying lyrics written by Samuel Alfred Haynes.

References

1899 births
1977 deaths
Belizean musicians
Belizean composers
Male composers
National anthem writers
20th-century male musicians